The 2008 Men's Central American and Caribbean Basketball Championship, also known as 2008 Centrobasket, was hosted in Cancún and Chetumal, México. The four semifinalists of this edition qualified for the 2009 FIBA Americas championship.


First phase

Group A

Group B

Bracket

Semifinals

The top 2 teams from each group advance to the semifinals, in which the top team of Group A plays against the second place team of Group B and the top team of Group B plays against the second place team of Group A.

Three-team ties are determined by the point differential in games played between the three teams, not counting the margin of victory or loss against a non tied team.

Final
Puerto Rico(5-0) V.S. USVI (3-2) Gold Medal Game

References
Official Web Site: FIBA Americas

Centrobasket
2008–09 in North American basketball
2008 in Central American sport
2008 in Caribbean sport
2008 in Mexican sports
International basketball competitions hosted by Mexico
Sport in Quintana Roo